Metarctia sarcosoma is a moth of the subfamily Arctiinae. It was described by George Hampson in 1901. It is found in Kenya and Uganda.

References

 

Metarctia
Moths described in 1901